Lermontovsky Prospekt is a station on Moscow Metro's Tagansko-Krasnopresnenskaya line. It is located between Vykhino and Zhulebino and opened, together with Zhulebino, on 9 November 2013. The construction of Lermontovsky Prospekt and Zhulebino was needed to unload Vykhino, which by the time of construction was the most crowded station of Moscow Metro.

Lermontovsky Prospekt is a shallow single-vault station. It is located below the central line of Lermontovsky Avenue, approximately from northwest to southeast. The station has five exits. Two of them are located at the northwestern side, at both sides of Lermontovsky Avenue, and three more at the southeastern side, at both sides of Khvalynsky Boulevard.

On 3 June 2019, the inaugural stretch of the Nekrasovskaya line was opened. Lermontovsky Prospekt was connected by a transfer to Kosino, the former west terminus of the line.

Location
The territory at which the station currently located was until 1984 a part of the town of Lyubertsy of Moscow Oblast. In 1984 it was transferred to Moscow, and subsequently rapid urban development started. The whole area, along with Lyubertsy and other areas along the Kazansky and Ryazansky suburban directions of Moscow Railway were strongly dependent on the station of Vykhino, then the terminus of the Tagansko-Krasnopresnenskaya Line and a transfer station to both railway directions. In the 2000s, Vykhino was heavily overloaded. Eventually, the decision was taken to extend the Tagansko-Krasnopresnenskaya Line beyond Vykhino. The construction of the first stretch, with the stations of Lermontovsky Prospekt and Zhulebino, started in August 2011. The tunnels were completed by September 2013.

References

Moscow Metro stations
Railway stations in Russia opened in 2013
Tagansko-Krasnopresnenskaya Line
Railway stations located underground in Russia